William II the Young (died 12 December 926) was the Count of Auvergne and Duke of Aquitaine from 918 to his death, succeeding his uncle William I.

William was son of the Acfred I of Carcassonne and Adelinde, William I's sister and Bernard Plantapilosa's daughter. Immediately after succeeding his uncle, he made war on the Burgundians and Normans, who refused to accept Rudolph as king of France. His support of the king, however, was insincere. He later revolted and Rudolph led an army into Aquitaine, but was called back to defend the Rhine from the Magyars. William died soon after.

In 924 the duke Raoul of Burgundy came up to the Loire river and William was forced to make his submission to him. Upon which Raoul, relieved that such a powerful vassal accepted his suzerainty, gave him back the counties of Berry and Macon and the town of Bourges.

 Dukes of Aquitaine family tree

Sources 
 Nouvelle Biographie Générale. Paris, 1859.
 Memoirs of the Queens of France. Anne Forbes Bush.

References 

926 deaths
Dukes of Aquitaine
Counts of Auvergne
10th-century people from West Francia
10th-century Visigothic people
Year of birth unknown